Homonotus is a genus of spider hunting wasps with an old world distribution, mainly in Africa.

Species in the genus include

Homonotus aegyptiacus Turner, 1917
Homonotus coxalis Dahlbom, 1843
Homonotus disparilis Turner, 1917
Homonotus dispersus Dahlbom, 1843
Homonotus dissectus Dahlbom, 1843
Homonotus formosanus Yasumatsu 1933
Homonotus fuscipes Dahlbom, 1843
Homonotus imitans Dahlbom, 1843
Homonotus iwatai Yasumatsu 1932
Homonotus leptogaster Dahlbom, 1843
Homonotus okinawanus Tsuneki 1990
Homonotus ruficornis Cameron, 1905
Homonotus rukwaensis Arnold, 1946
Homonotus sanguinolentus (Fabricius, 1793)
Homonotus sansibaricus Dahlbom, 1843
Homonotus semiflavus Priesner 1955
Homonotus tagalicus Banks 1934
Homonotus taiwanus Tsuneki 1990

References

Hymenoptera genera
Pompilinae